Hakan Durmuş (born 3 March 1973), better known by his stage name Killa Hakan, is a Germany born Turkish rapper and songwriter.

Biography 

Born in Berlin, West Germany, Hakan is one of the first Turkish rappers, and the first hardcore/gangsta rapper in Turkey. Before turning to music, he was a 36 Boys gang member and imprisoned for burglary, bank robbery, and wounding.

Hakan started his professional music career by joining the band Islamic Force of Boe B. In 1997, they published the album "Mesaj". After Islamic Force separated, Hakan continued as a solo artist.

So far, Hakan has released nine albums, the latest being "Son Mohakan" released in January.

Discography

Productions starring

References

External links 
 
 Killa Hakan on Spotify
 

1973 births
Turkish rappers
German rappers
German songwriters
Hip hop activists
German people of Turkish descent
Living people
Turkish songwriters
Gangsta rappers
German lyricists
German male singers
Turkish lyricists
Turkish male singers